Joseph or Joe Smith may refer to:

Arts and entertainment
Joseph Smith (art collector) (1682–1770), British art collector and consul at Venice
Joseph A. Smith (artist) (born 1936), American artist and professor at the Pratt Institute 
Joseph Lindon Smith (1863–1950), American painter
Joe Smith (comedian) (1884–1981), American comedian
Joseph C. Smith (1883–1965), American violinist, composer and band leader
Joseph Smith (dancer) (1875–1932), American dancer
Joe Smith (musician) (1902–1937), American jazz trumpeter
Joe Smith (music industry executive) (1928–2019), American music industry executive
Sonny Knight or Joseph C. Smith (1934–1998), American R&B singer and author
Pepe Smith or Joseph William Feliciano Smith (1947–2019), Filipino musician
Joseph Smith (pianist) (1948–2015), American pianist, author, and lecturer
Joe Smith, American, a 1942 American spy film

Military
Joseph Smith (East India Company officer) (1732/3–1790), British East India Company Army Brigadier General
Joseph Smith (admiral) (1790–1877), American admiral during the American Civil War
Joseph B. Smith (1826–1861), U.S. Navy officer

Politics
Joseph Smith (Michigan politician) (1809–1880), American businessman and politician in the Michigan House of Representatives
Joseph Crowther Smith (1818–1886), mayor of Wolverhampton, 1865–66
Joseph Showalter Smith (1824–1884), U.S. Representative from Oregon
Joe L. Smith (1880–1962), American Democratic Party politician from West Virginia
J. Joseph Smith (1904–1980), U.S. Representative from Connecticut
Joseph Smith (Australian politician) (1904–1993), member of the Victorian Parliament
Joe F. Smith (1918–2013), American Democratic Party politician from West Virginia
Joseph F. Smith (Pennsylvania politician) (1920–1999), United States Representative from Pennsylvania
Joseph A. Smith (sheriff) (1911–2003), American politician; Sheriff of Worcester County, Massachusetts, 1962–1977
Joseph Henry Smith (born 1945), Minister for Defence of Ghana
Joe Smith (Missouri politician) (born c. 1973), Republican member of the Missouri House of Representatives

Religion
Joseph Smith (academic) (1670–1756), English churchman and Provost of the Queen's College, Oxford
Joseph Smith (Presbyterian minister, born 1796) (1796–?), Presbyterian minister, author, and academic
Joseph Smith (Presbyterian minister, born 1736) (1736–1792), Presbyterian minister and founder of Washington & Jefferson College
Joseph Smith Sr. (1771–1840), father of Joseph Smith, and first Presiding Patriarch in the Latter Day Saint movement
Joseph Smith (1805–1844), an American religious leader and the founder of the Latter Day Saint movement, which gave rise to Mormonism
Joseph Smith III (1832–1914), Prophet-President of the Reorganized Church of Jesus Christ of Latter Day Saints
Joseph F. Smith (1838–1918), nephew of Joseph Smith; sixth president of The Church of Jesus Christ of Latter-day Saints
Joseph Fielding Smith (1876–1972), son of Joseph F. Smith and tenth president of  The Church of Jesus Christ of Latter-day Saints
Joseph Fielding Smith (patriarch) (1899–1964), Patriarch to the Church of The Church of Jesus Christ of Latter-day Saints from 1942 to 1946

Sports
Association football
Joe Smith (footballer, born 1886) (1886–?), English footballer for Hull City, Everton and Bury
Joseph Smith (footballer, born 1888) (1888–1928), English footballer with Sheffield United and Derby County
Joe Smith (football forward, born 1889) (1889–1971), England international footballer with Bolton Wanderers and manager of Blackpool
Joe Smith (football halfback, born 1889) (1889–1916), English footballer with Birmingham and Chesterfield, killed in action during the First World War
Joe Smith (footballer, born 1890) (1890–1956), England international footballer with West Bromwich Albion
Joe Smith (footballer, born 1908) (1908–1993), English footballer with Watford
Joe Smith (winger), English professional footballer with Burnley
Joe Smith (footballer, born 1953), Scottish footballer with Aberdeen

Baseball
Joe Smith (1910s pitcher), American baseball player
Joe Smith (catcher) (1893–1974), American baseball catcher
Joe Smith (2010s pitcher) (born 1984), American baseball player

Gridiron football
Joe Smith (American football coach) (1873–1923), American football player and coach
Joseph Smith (American football) (fl. 1989–present), American college football player and coach, head football coach at Linfield College
Joe Smith (running back) (born 1979), American professional gridiron football player
Joe Bob Smith, (1934–2011) American-born Canadian football player

Other sports
Joe Smith (athlete) (1917–1993), American marathon runner
Joseph Smith (bobsleigh) (1925–1983), American bobsledder
Joseph Smith (cricketer) (born 1946), Jamaican-born former English cricketer
Joe Smith (basketball) (born 1975), American basketball player
Joe Troy Smith (born 1977), American basketball player
Joe Smith Jr. (born 1989), American boxer
Joe Smith (rugby union) (born 1991), South African rugby union player and powerlifter

Other people
Joseph Smith (explorer) (died 1764), British fur trader and explorer
Joseph Lee Smith (1776–1846), American lawyer, soldier, and jurist
Joe Frazer Smith (1897–1957), American architect and author
Joseph Smith (aircraft designer) (1897–1956), English aircraft designer who took over from R.J. Mitchell as Chief Designer for Supermarine
Joseph A. Smith Jr. (fl. 1974–present), professor of urology, editor-in-chief of Journal of Urology''
Joseph Saumarez Smith (born 1971), British entrepreneur, journalist and gambling expert
Joseph Colin Smith (1931–2016), British urologist

See also
Joel Smith (disambiguation)
Joseph Smit, Dutch zoological illustrator. 
Smith (surname)
Smith family (Latter Day Saints)